Yang Xia (Chinese: 杨霞; born January 8, 1977, in Hunan) is a female Chinese weightlifter. She currently studies journalism at Hunan Normal University.

Major performances
1993 National Games - 1st
1996 National Championships - 5th 59 kg
1998 Bangkok Asian Games - 1st 53 kg
2000 Sydney Olympic Games - 1st 53 kg total
2001 National Games - 1st 53 kg

References
  - China Daily

1977 births
Living people
Chinese female weightlifters
Olympic weightlifters of China
Weightlifters at the 2000 Summer Olympics
Olympic gold medalists for China
Olympic medalists in weightlifting
Asian Games medalists in weightlifting
Weightlifters from Hunan
People from Xiangxi
Weightlifters at the 1998 Asian Games
Tujia people
Medalists at the 2000 Summer Olympics
Asian Games gold medalists for China
Medalists at the 1998 Asian Games
20th-century Chinese women
21st-century Chinese women
Fellows of the American Physical Society